"Jingle Jangle" is a song written by Jeff Barry and Andy Kim and performed by The Archies. It was produced by Jeff Barry. The single reached number 10 on the Billboard Hot 100 and number 27 on the U.S. Easy Listening chart in 1969.  In January 1970, it went to number 1 for one week in Canada. The song appeared on the 1969 album, Jingle Jangle.

Chart performance

Popular culture
In the television show Riverdale, based on the Archie comics, Jingle-Jangle is introduced as a potent recreational drug. The Archies' version of the song is briefly heard in the episode "Chapter Thirty-Eight: As Above, So Below".

References

The Archies songs
1969 songs
1969 singles
Songs from television series
Songs written by Jeff Barry
Songs written by Andy Kim
RPM Top Singles number-one singles